In Love & War is the fourth studio album by American singer Amerie, released November 3, 2009 on Def Jam Recordings. Recording sessions for the album took place between 2008 and 2009 at Record Plant Studios in Hollywood, California and at other recording studios in Miami, Florida and Atlanta, Georgia. The album serves as Amerie's first release after leaving Columbia Records and forming her own label, Feenix Rising, which released the album under exclusive license and distribution through the Island Def Jam Music Group.

The album debuted at number forty-six on the US Billboard 200 chart, selling 12,500 copies in its first week. Upon its release, In Love & War received generally positive reviews from most music critics.

Background 
In January 2008, Entertainment Weekly reported that Amerie had left her record label, Columbia Records, and in April 2008, Amerie's name was removed from the label's roster. Recording sessions for the album took place during 2008 to 2009 at Record Plant Studios in Hollywood, California, and at other recording studios in Miami, Florida and Atlanta, Georgia. On her official Twitter account, Amerie revealed that she had been secretly recording new music in Atlanta, Georgia, and that a late summer July/August release date was in the works, with a possible first single in late May or early June.

In multiple interviews, Amerie confirmed that Rich Harrison, who had produced her previous work, would not be contributing to the album. At the end of April, Amerie revealed on Twitter that the album's title to be changed from Breakups to Makeups to In Love & War. She also announced that the album's first single is "Why R U", which she cited with "Higher" as one of two of her favorite tracks from the album.

Music 
Amerie has described the album's sound as "a fusion of hip hop, soul and old school rock". She spoke about the concept of In Love & War in an interview with The Green Magazine, stating:

The album features collaborations with rapper Fabolous and singer Trey Songz. The latter has a guest appearance on "Pretty Brown", which samples R&B group Mint Condition's "Breakin' My Heart (Pretty Brown Eyes)" (1991). The song was produced by Australian hip hop producer M-Phazes.

Title and artwork 
The album was originally titled Breakups to Makeups. However, in April 2009, Amerie announced that the album's title would be In Love & War via her official Twitter account. The full-length album artwork was illustrated by David Bray and photographed by Tim Bret-Day. Album sampler EP's artwork is different from the album's. The sampler was titled Prelude to In Love & War and was released in September 2009.

Release and promotion 
After several delays of the album's release date in August and September, it was announced on August 13, 2009 that the album would be released November 3, 2009. Amerie had stated via her Twitter account that she was satisfied with the release date and that it has a special meaning to her. On September 27, 2009, Amerie premiered the album cover on her official Twitter page. In Love & War was released on November 3, 2009 in the United States under exclusive license by Amerie's own imprint label, Feenix Rising, which distributed it through the Island Def Jam Music Group.

Three singles were released in promotion of the album, including "Why R U" on June 15, 2009, "Heard 'Em All" on September 15, 2009, and "Pretty Brown" on October 20, 2009. Def Jam released a six-track album sampler containing snippets of "Higher", "Tell Me You Love Me", "Pretty Brown", and "Red Eye", as well full versions of "Heard 'Em All" and "Why R U", which had been remastered. Amerie performed "Heard 'Em All" and "Higher" in November 2009 on Jimmy Kimmel Live!. A music video for "More Than Love" featuring Fabolous, directed by Taj was released in January 2010.

She released a remix version of the song "Heard 'Em All" for the Asian edition of In Love & War where she will collaborate with Korean girl group 4minute and rapper Junhyung of Korean boy band BEAST

Commercial performance 
In the United States, In Love & War debuted at number forty-six on the U.S. Billboard 200 and at number three on the Top R&B/Hip-Hop Albums chart. By November 9, 2009, it had sold 12,421 copies in the United States, resulting in sales of 12,500 in its first week. The album also charted in the United Kingdom on the UK R&B Albums at number twenty-nine on November 15, 2009. In 2010, it peaked at number eighteen on the South Korean Gaon Albums Chart.

Critical reception 

Upon its release, the album received generally positive reviews from most music critics. At Metacritic, which assigns a normalized rating out of hundred to reviews from mainstream critics, the album received an average score of seventy-eight, based on eight reviews, which indicates "generally favorable reviews". About.com's Mark Edward Nero gave it 3½ out of five stars and called it "a hip, energetic album that properly showcases her singing talent". Alex Denney of Yahoo! Music gave In Love & War a rating of eight out of ten and lauded Amerie for her "old-skool virtues" and sound, while calling the album "an exemplary exercise in R&B songwriting and performance, brim-full of verve, spark and vigour". Hot Press writer Patrick Freyne gave the album a rating of three and a half out of five, writing "Amerie’s got the standard range and power of the production line diva but there’s also an appealingly raw, in need-of-some-Calpol-edge to her voice which gives everything that little bit more power". The Irish Times gave it three out of four stars, writing that Amerie "approaches In Love & War with much gusto".

In contrast, Steve Jones of USA Today gave the album 2½ out of four stars and expressed a mixed response towards its ballads, stating "The sassy funk numbers serve her best, while the mushy stuff only slows her down". Despite writing favorably of its uptempo tracks, Rolling Stones Christian Hoard gave the album three out of five stars and perceived its slower material as a weakness. Boston Herald writer Lauren Carter gave In Love & War a B− rating and commended its "ambient, hip-hop-infused R&B" tracks, but wrote that "monotonous lyrics about rocky or recently ended relationships dominate the album". However, AllMusic's Andy Kellman gave the album four out of five stars and wrote favorably of its ballads, calling them "as well constructed as anything earlier in the set". In his consumer guide for MSN Music, critic Robert Christgau gave it a rating of honorable mention, indicating "an enjoyable effort consumers attuned to its overriding aesthetic or individual vision may well treasure".

Track listing 

Sample credits
"Why R U" contains a sample of "Ego Trippin'" by Ultramagnetic MCs.
"More Than Love" contains a sample of "Summer Madness (Live)" by Kool & the Gang.
"Pretty Brown" contains a sample of "Breakin' My Heart (Pretty Brown Eyes)" by Mint Condition.

Personnel 
Credits for In Love & War adapted from liner notes.

Musicians 
 Amerie – Lead vocals, producer, co-writer
 Trey Songz – featuring artist, co-writer
 Fabolous – featuring artist, co-writer
 Lil Wayne – featuring artist, co-writer
 Francesco Romano – guitar
 David Siegel – keyboards
 Sean Windsor – guitar
 Larry Sommerville – keyboards
 She McElroy- background vocals,  co-writer

Production 

 Karma – producer
 Eric Hudson – producer
 L.A. Reid – executive producer
 Teddy Riley – producer, engineer
 J. Peter Robinson – art direction
 Delroy Pearson – producer
 Deborah Mannis-Gardner – sample clearance
 Vernon Mungo – engineer
 James M. Wisner – engineer
 Warryn Campbell – producer
 Chris Atlas – marketing
 Walter "Mucho" Scott – producer
 Cornell Brown – engineer
 Mike Houge – engineer
 Bryan-Michael Cox – producer
 Jim Jonsin – producer
 Bruce Buechner – engineer

 Amy Neiman – photo coordination
 Lenny "Linen" Nicholson – producer, executive producer, management
 Sam Thomas – engineer
 Tim Bret Day – art direction
 Herb Power Jr. – mastering
 Sean Garrett – producer
 Victor Abijaudi – engineer
 Rico Love – producer
 Miles Walker – engineer
 Mark "Exit" Goodchild – engineer
 Jordan "DJ Swivel" Young – engineer
 Jonas Jeberg – producer
 Graham Marsh – engineer
 David Bray – art direction, illustrations
 Daniel "2Dark" Richards – instrumentation
 Lee Stuart – art direction

Charts

Release history

References

External links 
 Album sampler at Island Def Jam Music Group
 Amerie’s ‘In Love & War’ Sets Benchmark For Rihanna’s ‘Rated R’ at BlackBook Magazine

2009 albums
Amerie albums
Albums produced by Eric Hudson
Albums produced by Jim Jonsin
Albums produced by Rico Love
Albums produced by Sean Garrett
Albums produced by Teddy Riley
Albums produced by Warryn Campbell
Def Jam Recordings albums
Albums produced by M-Phazes
Albums produced by Bryan-Michael Cox